Grier-Rea House is a historic farmhouse located near Charlotte, Mecklenburg County, North Carolina. The "L"-shaped dwelling consists of a two-story, side-gable main block built about 1815, with an original, one-story, rear shed appendage and a two-story, rear ell added about 1830. Also added about 1830 was the hip roofed front porch.  The house was moved to its present location in 2002.

It was listed on the National Register of Historic Places in 2010.

References

Houses on the National Register of Historic Places in North Carolina
Houses completed in 1815
Houses in Charlotte, North Carolina
National Register of Historic Places in Mecklenburg County, North Carolina